Henry V (16 September 1386 – 31 August 1422), also called Henry of Monmouth, was King of England from 1413 until his death in 1422. Despite his relatively short reign, Henry's outstanding military successes in the Hundred Years' War against France made England one of the strongest military powers in Europe. Immortalised in Shakespeare's "Henriad" plays, Henry is known and celebrated as one of the greatest warrior-kings of medieval England.

During the reign of his father Henry IV, Henry gained military experience fighting the Welsh during the revolt of Owain Glyndŵr and against the powerful aristocratic Percy family of Northumberland at the Battle of Shrewsbury. Henry acquired an increased role in England's government due to the king's declining health, but disagreements between father and son led to political conflict between the two. After his father's death in 1413, Henry assumed control of the country and asserted the pending English claim to the French throne.

In 1415, Henry embarked on war with France. His first military campaign included his famous victory at the Battle of Agincourt in 1415. By 1420, his armies had captured Paris and had come close to conquering the whole of medieval France. Taking advantage of political divisions within France, he conquered large portions of Northern France, resulting in Normandy's occupation by the English for the first time since the mid-14th century. After months of negotiation with Charles VI of France, the 1420 Treaty of Troyes recognised Henry V as regent and heir apparent to the French throne, and he was subsequently married to Charles's daughter, Catherine of Valois. Everything seemed to point to the formation of a union between the kingdoms, in the person of Henry. However, he died two years later and was succeeded by his only child, the infant Henry VI.

Analyses of Henry's reign are varied. He was widely praised for his personal piety, bravery and military genius even by contemporary French chroniclers, but his occasionally cruel temperament and lack of focus on domestic affairs has made him the subject of some criticism. Nonetheless, his militaristic pursuits during the Hundred Years' War created a strong sense of English nationalism and set the stage for the rise of England and then later Britain to prominence as a dominant global power.

Early life
Henry was born in the tower above the gatehouse of Monmouth Castle in Wales, and for that reason was sometimes called Henry of Monmouth. He was the son of Henry of Bolingbroke (later Henry IV of England) and Mary de Bohun. His father's cousin was the reigning English monarch, King Richard II. Henry's paternal grandfather was the influential John of Gaunt, a son of King Edward III. As he was not close to the line of succession to the throne, Henry's date of birth was not officially documented, and for many years it was disputed whether he was born in 1386 or 1387. However, records indicate that his younger brother Thomas was born in the autumn of 1387 and that his parents were at Monmouth in 1386 but not in 1387. It is now accepted that he was born on 16 September 1386.

Upon the exile of Henry's father in 1398, Richard II took the boy into his own charge and treated him kindly. The young Henry accompanied Richard to Ireland. While in the royal service, he visited Trim Castle in County Meath, the ancient meeting place of the Parliament of Ireland.

In 1399, John of Gaunt died. In the same year, King Richard II was overthrown by the Lancastrian usurpation that brought Henry's father to the throne, and Henry was recalled from Ireland into prominence as heir apparent to the Kingdom of England. He was created Prince of Wales at his father's coronation and Duke of Lancaster on 10 November 1399, the third person to hold the title that year. His other titles were Duke of Cornwall, Earl of Chester and Duke of Aquitaine. A contemporary record notes that in 1399, Henry spent time at The Queen's College, Oxford, under the care of his uncle Henry Beaufort, the chancellor of the university. During this time, due to taking a liking to both literature and music, he learned to read and write; this made him the first English King that was educated in this regard. He even went on to grant pensions to composers due to such love for music. 

From 1400 to 1404, he carried out the duties of High Sheriff of Cornwall. During that time, Henry would also be in command of part of the English forces. He led his own army into Wales against Owain Glyndŵr and joined forces with his father to fight Henry "Hotspur" Percy at the Battle of Shrewsbury in 1403. It was there that the 16-year-old prince was almost killed by an arrow that became impaled on the left side of his face. An ordinary soldier might have died from such a wound, but Henry had the benefit of the best possible care. Over a period of several days, John Bradmore, the royal physician, treated the wound with honey to act as an antiseptic, crafted a tool to screw into the embedded arrowhead (bodkin point) and thus extract it without doing further damage, and flushed the wound with alcohol. The operation was successful, but it left Henry with permanent scars, evidence of his experience in battle. Bradmore recorded this account in Latin, in his manuscript titled Philomena. Henry's treatment also appeared in an anonymous Middle English surgical treatise dated to 1446, that has since been attributed to Thomas Morstede.

Early military career and role in Government
The Welsh revolt of Owain Glyndŵr absorbed Henry's energies until 1408. Then, as a result of the king's ill health, Henry began to take a wider share in politics. From January 1410, helped by his uncles Henry and Thomas Beaufort, legitimised sons of John of Gaunt, he had practical control of the government. Both in foreign and domestic policy he differed from the king, who discharged his son from the council in November 1411. The quarrel of father and son was political only, though it is probable that the Beauforts had discussed the abdication of Henry IV. Their opponents certainly endeavoured to defame Prince Henry.

It may be that the tradition of Henry's riotous youth, immortalised by Shakespeare, is partly due to political enmity. Henry's record of involvement in war and politics, even in his youth, disproves this tradition. The most famous incident, his quarrel with the chief justice, has no contemporary authority and was first related by Sir Thomas Elyot in 1531.

The story of Falstaff originated in Henry's early friendship with Sir John Oldcastle, a supporter of the Lollards. Shakespeare's Falstaff was originally named "Oldcastle," following his main source, The Famous Victories of Henry V. Oldcastle's descendants objected, and the name was changed (the character became a composite of several real persons, including Sir John Fastolf). That friendship, and the prince's political opposition to Thomas Arundel, Archbishop of Canterbury, perhaps encouraged Lollard hopes. If so, their disappointment may account for the statements of ecclesiastical writers like Thomas Walsingham that Henry, on becoming king, was suddenly changed into a new man.

Reign

After Henry IV died on 20 March 1413, Henry V succeeded him and was crowned on 9 April 1413 at Westminster Abbey. The ceremony was marked by a terrible snowstorm, but the common people were undecided as to whether it was a good or bad omen. Henry was described as having been "very tall (6 feet 3 inches), slim, with dark hair cropped in a ring above the ears, and clean-shaven". His complexion was ruddy, the face lean with a prominent and pointed nose. Depending on his mood, his eyes "flashed from the mildness of a dove's to the brilliance of a lion's".

Henry tackled all of the domestic policies together and gradually built on them a wider policy. From the first, he made it clear that he would rule England as the head of a united nation. He let past differences be forgotten—the late Richard II was honourably re-interred; the young Edmund Mortimer, 5th Earl of March, was taken into favour; the heirs of those who had suffered under the last reign were restored gradually to their titles and estates. Yet, where Henry saw a grave domestic danger, he acted firmly and ruthlessly, such as the Lollard discontent in January 1414 and including the execution by burning of Henry's old friend Sir John Oldcastle in 1417 to "nip the movement in the bud" and make his own position as ruler secure.

Henry's reign was generally free from serious trouble at home. The exception was the Southampton Plot in favour of Mortimer, involving Henry, Baron Scrope, and Richard, Earl of Cambridge (grandfather of the future King Edward IV), in July 1415. Mortimer himself remained loyal to the King.

Starting in August 1417, Henry promoted the use of the English language in government and his reign marks the appearance of Chancery Standard English as well as the adoption of English as the language of record within government. He was the first king to use English in his personal correspondence since the Norman conquest 350 years earlier.

Henry could now turn his attention to foreign affairs. A writer of the next generation was the first to allege that Henry was encouraged by ecclesiastical statesmen to enter into the French war as a means of diverting attention from home troubles. This story seems to have no foundation. Old commercial disputes and the support the French had lent to Owain Glyndŵr were used as an excuse for war, while the disordered state of France afforded no security for peace. King Charles VI of France was prone to mental illness; at times he thought he was made of glass, and his eldest surviving son was an unpromising prospect. However, it was the old dynastic claim to the throne of France, first pursued by Edward III of England, that justified war with France in English opinion.

Following the Battle of Agincourt, King Sigismund of Hungary (later Holy Roman Emperor) made a visit to Henry in hopes of making peace between England and France. His goal was to persuade Henry to modify his demands against the French. Henry lavishly entertained him and even had him enrolled in the Order of the Garter. Sigismund, in turn, inducted Henry into the Order of the Dragon. Henry had intended to crusade for the order after uniting the English and French thrones, but he died before fulfilling his plans. Sigismund left England several months later, having signed the Treaty of Canterbury acknowledging English claims to France.

War in France
Henry may have regarded the assertion of his own claims as part of his royal duty, but a permanent settlement of the national debate was essential to the success of his foreign policy.

1415 campaign 

On 12 August 1415, Henry sailed for France, where his forces besieged the fortress at Harfleur, capturing it on 22 September. Afterwards, he decided to march with his army across the French countryside toward Calais despite the warnings of his council. On 25 October, on the plains near the village of Agincourt, a French army intercepted his route. Despite his men-at-arms' being exhausted, outnumbered and malnourished, Henry led his men into battle, decisively defeating the French, who suffered severe losses. It is often argued that the French men-at-arms were bogged down in the muddy battlefield, soaked from the previous night of heavy rain, and that this hindered the French advance, allowing them to be sitting targets for the flanking English archers. Most were simply hacked to death while completely stuck in the deep mud. Nevertheless, the victory is seen as Henry's greatest, ranking alongside the Battle of Crécy (1346) and the Battle of Poitiers (1356) as the greatest English victories of the Hundred Years' War.

During the battle, Henry ordered that the French prisoners taken during the battle be put to death, including some of the most illustrious who could have been used for ransom. Cambridge historian Brett Tingley posits that Henry was concerned that the prisoners might turn on their captors when the English were busy repelling a third wave of enemy troops, thus jeopardising a hard-fought victory.

The victorious conclusion of Agincourt, from the English viewpoint, was only the first step in the campaign to recover the French possessions that he felt belonged to the English crown. Agincourt also held out the promise that Henry's pretensions to the French throne might be realised.

Diplomacy
Command of the sea was secured by driving the Genoese allies of the French out of the English Channel. While Henry was occupied with peace negotiations in 1416, a French and Genoese fleet surrounded the harbour at the English-garrisoned Harfleur. A French land force also besieged the town. In March 1416 a raiding force of soldiers under the Earl of Dorset, Thomas Beaufort, was attacked and narrowly escaped defeat at the Battle of Valmont after a counterattack by the garrison of Harfleur. To relieve the town, Henry sent his brother, John, Duke of Bedford, who raised a fleet and set sail from Beachy Head on 14 August. The Franco-Genoese fleet was defeated the following day after the gruelling seven-hour Battle of the Seine and Harfleur was relieved. Diplomacy successfully detached Emperor Sigismund from supporting France, and the Treaty of Canterbury—also signed in August 1416—confirmed a short-lived alliance between England and the Holy Roman Empire.

1417–20 campaign and 1421 campaign

With those two potential enemies gone, and after two years of patient preparation following the Battle of Agincourt, Henry renewed the war on a larger scale in 1417. After taking Caen, he quickly conquered Lower Normandy and Rouen was cut off from Paris and besieged. This siege has cast an even darker shadow on the reputation of the king, along with his order to slay the French prisoners at Agincourt. Rouen, starving and unable to support the women and children of the town, forced them out through the gates believing that Henry would allow them to pass through his army unmolested. However, Henry refused to allow this, and the expelled women and children died of starvation in the ditches surrounding the town. The French were paralysed by the disputes between Burgundians and Armagnacs. Henry skilfully played one against the other without relaxing his warlike approach.

In January 1419, Rouen fell. Those Norman French who had resisted were severely punished: Alain Blanchard, who had hanged English prisoners from the walls of Rouen, was summarily executed; Robert de Livet, Canon of Rouen, who had excommunicated the English king, was packed off to England and imprisoned for five years.

By August, the English were outside the walls of Paris. The intrigues of the French parties culminated in the assassination of John the Fearless, Duke of Burgundy, by Dauphin Charles's partisans at Montereau-Fault-Yonne on 10 September. Philip the Good, the new duke, and the French court threw themselves into Henry's arms. After six months of negotiation, the Treaty of Troyes recognised Henry as the heir and regent of France. On 2 June 1420 at Troyes Cathedral, he married Catherine of Valois, the French king's daughter. They had only one son, Henry, born on 6 December 1421 at Windsor Castle. From June to July 1420, King Henry's army besieged and took the military fortress castle at Montereau-Fault-Yonne close to Paris. He besieged and captured Melun in November 1420, returning to England shortly thereafter. In 1428, Charles VII retook Montereau, to once again see the English take it over within a short time. Finally, on 10 October 1437, Charles VII was victorious in regaining Montereau-Fault-Yonne.

While Henry was in England, his brother Thomas, Duke of Clarence, led the English forces in France. On 22 March 1421, Thomas led the English to a disastrous defeat at the Battle of Baugé against a Franco-Scottish army. The duke was killed in the battle. On 10 June, Henry sailed back to France to retrieve the situation. It was to be his last military campaign. From July to August, Henry's forces besieged and captured Dreux, thus relieving allied forces at Chartres. On 6 October, his forces laid siege to Meaux, capturing it on 11 May 1422.

Death
Henry V died on 31 August 1422 at the Château de Vincennes. The commonly held view is that Henry V contracted dysentery in the period just after the Siege of Meaux, which ended on 9 May 1422. However the symptoms and severity of dysentery present themselves fairly quickly and he seems to have been healthy in the weeks following the siege. At the time speculative causes of his illness also included smallpox, the bacterial infection erysipelas and even leprosy. But there is no doubt he had contracted a serious illness sometime between May and June. Recovering at the castle of Vincennes, by the end of June it seems he was well enough to lead his forces with the intent of engaging the Dauphinist forces at Cosne-sur-Loire. At the outset he would have been riding in full armour, probably in blistering heat, as the summer of 1422 was extremely hot. He was struck down again, with a debilitating fever, possibly heatstroke, or a relapse of his previous illness. Whatever the cause or causes, he would not recover from this final bout of illness. For a few short weeks he was carried around in a litter, and his enemies having retreated, he decided to return to Paris. One story has of him trying, one last time, to mount a horse at Charenton and failing. He was taken back to Vincennes, around 10 August, where he died some weeks later. He was 35 years old and had reigned for nine years. Shortly before his death, Henry V named his brother, John, Duke of Bedford, regent of France in the name of his son, Henry VI of England, then only a few months old. Henry V did not live to be crowned King of France himself, as he might confidently have expected after the Treaty of Troyes, because Charles VI, to whom he had been named heir, survived him by two months.

Henry's comrade-in-arms and Lord Steward, John Sutton, 1st Baron Dudley, brought Henry's body back to England and bore the royal standard at his funeral. Henry V was buried in Westminster Abbey on 7 November 1422. An exhumation in 1953, in which it appeared that Henry V shared a grave with Richard Courtenay, led to speculation that Henry and Courtenay had been lovers. However, Courtenay's grave was found in the base of Henry's chantry, perchance disturbed when the king's memorial was built. Henry's last will and codicils, which gave specific instructions on how he should be buried, made no mention of a co-burial with anyone else.

Arms
Henry's arms as Prince of Wales were those of the kingdom, differenced by a label argent of three points. Upon his accession, he inherited use of the arms of the kingdom undifferenced.

Marriage
After his father became king, it was suggested that Henry marry the widow of Richard II, Isabella of Valois, but this had been refused. After this, there were negotiations to arrange a marriage with Catherine of Pomerania, Countess Palatine of Neumarkt, for three years, between 1401 and 1404, but it ultimately failed.

In 1420 Henry V married Catherine of Valois, daughter of Charles VI of France and younger sister of Isabella of Valois. Her dowry, upon the agreement between the two kingdoms, was 600,000 crowns. Together the couple had one child, Henry, born in late 1421. Upon Henry V's death in 1422, the infant prince became King Henry VI of England.

Ancestry and family

See also

 Cultural depictions of Henry V of England
 Dafydd Gam
 Dieu et mon droit
 English longbow
 List of English monarchs
 List of earls in the reign of Henry V of England

Footnotes

Further reading

External links

 
 
 .
 
 
 .
 
 BBC Radio 4 Great Lives on Henry V – listen online: 

|-

|-

 
1386 births
1422 deaths
14th-century English nobility
15th-century English nobility
15th-century English monarchs
Alumni of The Queen's College, Oxford
Burials at Westminster Abbey
Deaths from dysentery
Dukes of Cornwall
Dukes of Lancaster
English people of French descent
English pretenders to the French throne
English Roman Catholics
High Sheriffs of Cornwall
House of Lancaster
House of Valois
Infectious disease deaths in France
Knights of the Garter
Lords Warden of the Cinque Ports
Male Shakespearean characters
Order of the Dragon
People from Monmouth, Wales
People of the Hundred Years' War
Princes of Wales
Regents of France
Sons of kings
Children of Henry IV of England